Pierre Bardin (1590 – 29 May 1635), born in Rouen, was a French philosopher and mathematician and Doctor of Letters. He was one of the first members of the Académie française and the first occupant of Seat 29.

1590 births
1635 deaths
17th-century French writers
17th-century French male writers
17th-century French mathematicians
17th-century French philosophers
Members of the Académie Française